William F. Miller (September 24, 1869 – September 7, 1954) was a member of the Wisconsin State Assembly.

Biography
Miller was born on September 24, 1869 in Barre, Wisconsin. He later resided in West Salem, Wisconsin. He died in La Crosse in 1954.

Career
Miller was a member of the Assembly three times. First, from 1921 to 1924, second, from 1929 to 1932 and third, from 1939 to 1944. He was a Republican.

See also
The Political Graveyard

References

External links

People from La Crosse County, Wisconsin
Republican Party members of the Wisconsin State Assembly
1869 births
1954 deaths
People from West Salem, Wisconsin